Australian tiger may refer to:

Ictinogomphus australis, a species of clubtail dragonfly in the genus Ictinogomphus
Thylacine, known as the Australian tiger or Tasmanian tiger

Animal common name disambiguation pages